{|

{{Infobox ship characteristics
|Hide header=
|Header caption=
|Ship class=
|Ship type=Submarine chaser
|Ship tonnage=
|Ship displacement=* standard
 trial
|Ship length=* overall
 waterline
|Ship beam= 
|Ship height= 
|Ship draught= 
|Ship draft= 
|Ship propulsion= 2 × Kampon Mk.22 Model 6 diesels, 2 shafts, 2,600 bhp
|Ship power= 
|Ship speed= 
|Ship range=  at 
|Ship boats=
|Ship troops=
|Ship complement= 59
|Ship capacity=
|Ship crew=
|Ship EW=
|Ship armament=*2 × 40 mm heavy machine guns
36 × depth charges
2 × Type 94 depth charge projectors
1 × depth charge thrower
1 × Type 93 active sonar
1 × Type 93 hydrophone
No.4, November 19442 × 40 mm heavy machine guns
3 × Type 96 25 mm AA guns
36 × depth charges
2 × Type 94 depth charge projectors
2 × depth charge throwers (estimate)
1 × 13-Gō surface search radar
1 × Type 3 active sonar
1 × Type 93 hydrophone
|Ship armour=
}}

History
CH-5 was laid down on 25 January 1938 at the Mitsubishi Heavy Industries shipyard in Yokohama, launched on 28 July 1938, and completed and commissioned on 6 December 1938.

SCD 21 was at the time assigned to Rear Admiral Hirose Sueto's 2nd Base Force under Vice Admiral Ibō Takahashi's Third Fleet. She served mostly on escort duty during the war.

CH-5 was surrendered to the British Royal Navy after the war in severely damaged condition and scuttled on 11 July 1946 off Singapore. She was removed from the Navy list on 10 August 1946.

References

Additional references

1938 ships
No.4-class submarine chasers
Ships built by Mitsubishi Heavy Industries